The Tyrone Junior Football Club Championship (known for sponsorship reasons as the LCC Group Tyrone Junior Football Club Championship) is an annual Gaelic football competition contested by lower-tier Tyrone GAA clubs. The Tyrone County Board of the Gaelic Athletic Association has organised it since 1904.

In 2022, the Irish Independent said of Tyrone's football championship: "Tyrone can rightly lay claim to [be] the most competitive... of them all".

Stewartstown Harps are the title holders (2022) defeating Aghaloo O'Neills in the Final.

History
The first tournament was held in 1904 and Coalisland won that by defeating Killyclogher in the final.  

The trophy given to the winning club was renamed as the Pat D'Arcy Cup in 2018. 

From 2018, all championship games have been streamed live on Tyrone TV.

Honours
The trophy presented to the winners is the Pat D'Arcy Cup.

The winners of the Tyrone Junior Football Championship qualify to represent their county in the Ulster Junior Club Football Championship. They often do well there, winning It on numerous occasions. The winners can, in turn, go on to play in the All-Ireland Junior Club Football Championship.

The winners also gain promotion to Division 2 of the Tyrone All-County Football league for the following season, regardless of their final standing in the Division 3 league that year. Therefore as the winners compete in the Tyrone Intermediate Football Championship the following year, the holders do not defend their title.

List of finals
Teams in black no longer exist

Wins listed by club
 Rock St Patrick's (5): 1982, 2007, 2014, 2016, 2019

 St Patrick's, Greencastle: (4): 1936, 1992, 1998, 2006

 Killyman St Mary's (4): 1968, 1989, 2005, 2010

 Donaghmore St Patrick's (3): 1927, 1933, 1954

 Kildress Wolfe Tones (3): 1966, 1994, 2020

 Brackaville Owen Roes (3): 1996, 2012, 2015

 Cookstown Fr. Rock's (2): 1978, 2021

 Edendork St Malachy's (2): 1938, 1957

 Moy Tír Na nÓg (2): 1953, 1979

 Derrytresk Fir An Chnoic (2): 1955, 2011

 Clogher Éire Óg (2): 1972, 2000

 Stewartstown Harps (2): 2004, 2022

 Galbally Pearses (1): 1958

 Eglish St Patrick's (1): 1973

 Fintona Pearses (1): 1975

 Clann na nGael (1): 1997

 Drumragh Sarsfields (1): 1999

 Eskra Emmetts (1): 2003

 Augher St Macartan's (1): 2008

 Killeeshil St Mary's (1): 2013

 Tattyreagh St Patrick's (1): 2017

 Newtownstewart St Eugene's (1): 2018

References

3